Dallas Soonias (born April 25, 1984) is a male volleyball player from Canada, who competed for the Men's National Team as a right side hitter. He was a member of the national squad who won bronze at the 2015 Pan American Games in Toronto, Ontario, Canada.

Personal life 
Soonias is considered both Cree and Ojibwe. Along with his mother, he is registered at the Cape Croker First Nations reserve, whereas his father is Red Pheasant First Nation.

Dallas is married to volleyball player, Jaimie Thibeault.

They are both role models for Neechie Gear, a clothing brand which gives a 5% profit to give children the opportunity to participate in sports. The title of the company refers to a Cree greeting, which is warm and friendly.

Through Indigenous communities, he connects to youth to relate to them in a positive light, both through the court and through story telling. Volleyball on the Move Clinic is an example of this, where he worked through the program in various elementary schools in Whitehorse, Yukon in partnership with Volleyball Yukon.

Dallas has had experience assisted coaching at the University of Alberta for the men's volleyball team.

References

External links
 
 
 

1984 births
Living people
Canadian men's volleyball players
Sportspeople from Saskatoon
University of Alberta alumni
Volleyball players at the 2007 Pan American Games
First Nations sportspeople
Pan American Games medalists in volleyball
Pan American Games bronze medalists for Canada
Medalists at the 2015 Pan American Games